Jagadish Chandra Bhattacharyya, also known as J.C. Bhattacharyya (1 September 1930 in Calcutta – 4 June 2012 in New Delhi) was an Indian professor well known for his contributions in experimental astrophysics. He became the director of the Indian Institute of Astrophysics in 1982.

Discoveries
In 1971 he discovered a thin atmosphere around Ganymede, a satellite of Jupiter. For this he used ground-based, optical telescope at Kavalur, Tamil Nadu, India. In 1977 he discovered an extended ring system around Uranus using lunar an Occultation technique. The Voyager mission later confirmed his discovery.

References

Scientists from Kolkata
1931 births
2012 deaths
20th-century Indian astronomers